Carruthersia is a genus of plants in the family Apocynaceae first described as a genus in 1866. It is native to the Philippines and to certain islands of the Western Pacific.

Species
 Carruthersia glabra D.J.Middleton - Samar Island in Philippines
 Carruthersia latifolia Gillespie - Fiji, Tonga
 Carruthersia pilosa (A.DC.) Fern.-Vill. - Philippines, Solomon Islands, possibly Vanuatu
 Carruthersia scandens (Seem.) Seem. - Fiji

References 

Apocynaceae genera
Malouetieae